Tisotra is a village that is governed by Panchayat law in the Bijnor district of the Indian state of Uttar Pradesh. There is a Nootan Inter college in the village. The population as of 2011 was estimated at 3,921.

Geography 
It belongs to the Moradabad division and is situated 26km away from sub-district headquarter Najibabad and 61km away from district headquarter Bijnor. The elevation of this area is approximately 269 meter above sea level.

Economy 
The main activities of this village include cane plants, cane crushers, brickworks, wood-razing and bakeries.

Nearby villages
•	Keshopur
•	Dungarpur
•	Barkatpur
•	Lalpur Man
•	Sabalpur

Education 
It has a government-run primary and junior school & Nootan Inter Collage Tisitra.

References

Villages in Bijnor district